Real World/Road Rules Challenge: Battle of the Sexes is the sixth season of the MTV reality game show, The Challenge (at the time known as Real World/Road Rules Challenge). The season is directly subsequent to the first Battle of the Seasons. Battle of the Sexes featured cast members from The Real World and Road Rules. The cast stayed in the Round Hill Hotel and Villas Resort near Montego Bay, Jamaica. A casting special, Battle of the Sexes: The Good, the Bad, and the Notorious, was aired on December 30, 2002. The show premiered on January 6, 2003 and concluded on May 12, 2003.

This is the first edition of the Battle of the Sexes series, with Battle of the Sexes 2 following in 2004–2005.

Format
This season of the Real World/Road Rules Challenge features the same format as Battle of the Seasons, but instead of dividing teams by Real World and Road Rules teams, they are instead divided by gender. Each mission gave points based on finish, either with a partner or individually. After each mission, the players with the most points cumulative from each team became the "Inner Circle" and voted off whoever they wanted to. The winner of each challenge would earn a "lifesaver" which could be given to a member of either team; the recipient of the "lifesaver" would enjoy total immunity from being voted out, which created many interesting situations. After thirty people were voted off, fifteen for both genders, the final three Girls and final three Guys would compete against each other in a final race, earning $150,000 for themselves, $50,000 per teammate.

Contestants

Game summary

Elimination chart

Scoreboard progress

Competition
Bold indicates the contestants in the Inner Circle
 The contestant's team won the final challenge
 The contestant's team did not win the final challenge
 The contestant came in first in the challenge, won the Life Saver, and a prize
 The contestant was given the Life Saver by the winner of the challenge
 The contestant was safe from elimination
 The contestant was eliminated but was saved by the Life Saver
 The contestant was eliminated
 The contestant refused the Life Saver and was eliminated
 The contestant came in first in the challenge, won the Life Saver, won a prize and was eliminated
 The contestant quit the game

Teams

Episodes

Reunion special
The reunion special, Hot and Bothered: The Battle of the Sexes Reunion, was aired live on May 12, 2003 and was hosted by the season's host Jonny Moseley.

Notes

External links

MTV's official Road Rules website
MTV's official Real World website

Battle of the Sexes
2002 American television seasons
2003 American television seasons
Television shows set in Jamaica
Television shows filmed in Jamaica